Alandré van Rooyen (born ) is a South African rugby union player for the  in the Pro14. His regular position is hooker.

Rugby career

Schoolboy rugby

Van Rooyen was born in Port Elizabeth and represented his local  province at the 2013 Academy Week and 2014 Craven Week tournaments. Represented Eastern Province at the u18 Provincial Sevens tournament in 2013.

Blue Bulls

After school, he joined the Pretoria-based  academy. He progressed through the various age-groups, representing them at Under-19 level in 2015 and Under-21 level in 2016 and 2017.

Southern Kings

He made his debut in that competition in the team's 30–34 defeat to Welsh side , and also appeared against  the following week and against  in their match in George.

References

South African rugby union players
Living people
1996 births
Rugby union players from Port Elizabeth
Rugby union hookers
Blue Bulls players
Eastern Province Elephants players
Southern Kings players
Griquas (rugby union) players
London Irish players